The men's parallel bars event at the 2020 Summer Olympics was held on 24 July and 3 August 2021 at the Ariake Gymnastics Centre. Approximately 70 gymnasts from 35 nations (of the 98 total gymnasts) competed on parallel bars in the qualifying round.

Zou Jingyuan of China won the title for his first individual Olympic medal. Germany's Lukas Dauser earned the silver for his first Olympic medal. Ferhat Arıcan of Turkey rounded off the podium in bronze, earning not only his first Olympic medal, but also the first for his country in artistic gymnastics. The defending champion, Oleg Verniaiev from Ukraine, did not enter the competition as he was serving a doping ban.

The medals for the competition were presented by Jean-Christophe Rolland, Olympian, one Gold and one Bronze, France; IOC Member, and the medalists' bouquets were presented by Luo Chaoyi, People's Republic of China; FIG Executive Committee Member.

Background
This was the 25th appearance of the event, which is one of the five apparatus events held every time there were apparatus events at the Summer Olympics (no apparatus events were held in 1900, 1908, 1912, or 1920).

Qualification

A National Olympic Committee (NOC) could enter up to 6 qualified gymnasts: a team of 4 and up to 2 specialists. A total of 98 quota places are allocated to men's gymnastics.

The 12 teams that qualify will be able to send 4 gymnasts in the team competition, for a total of 48 of the 98 quota places. The top three teams at the 2018 World Artistic Gymnastics Championships (China, Russia, and Japan) and the top nine teams (excluding those already qualified) at the 2019 World Artistic Gymnastics Championships (Ukraine, Great Britain, Switzerland, the United States, Chinese Taipei, South Korea, Brazil, Spain, and Germany) earned team qualification places.

The remaining 50 quota places are awarded individually. Each gymnast can only earn one place, except that gymnasts that competed with a team that qualified are eligible to earn a second place through the 2020 All Around World Cup Series. Some of the individual events are open to gymnasts from NOCs with qualified teams, while others are not. These places are filled through various criteria based on the 2019 World Championships, the 2020 FIG Artistic Gymnastics World Cup series, continental championships, a host guarantee, and a Tripartite Commission invitation. 

Each of the 98 qualified gymnasts are eligible for the pommel horse competition, but many gymnasts do not compete in each of the apparatus events.

The COVID-19 pandemic delayed many of the events for qualifying for gymnastics. The 2018 and 2019 World Championships were completed on time, but many of the World Cup series events were delayed into 2021.

Competition format
The top 8 qualifiers in the qualification phase (limit two per NOC) advance to the apparatus final. The finalists perform an additional exercise. Qualification scores are then ignored, with only final round scores counting.

Schedule
The competition is held over two days, 24 July and 3 August. The qualifying round (for all men's gymnastics events) is the first day; the apparatus final is on the second day.

Results

Qualifying

 Reserves
The reserves for the men's parallel bars final were:
 
 
 

Only two gymnasts from each country may advance to the event final. Gymnasts who did not qualify for the final because of the quota, but had high enough scores to do so were:

Final

References

Men's parallel bars
2020
Men's 2020
Men's events at the 2020 Summer Olympics